Paul Rosner (born 11 December 1972) is a former professional tennis player from South Africa.

Career
From 1991 to 1995, Rosner competed in the United States, playing for University of Alabama at Birmingham in NCAA Men's Tennis Championship. He was an All-American on three occasions.

A doubles specialist, Rosner won 11 men's tournaments on the ATP Challenger Tour. He won one ATP World Tour title, at Bologna, Italy in 1998, with American Brandon Coupe.

Rosner entered into the Men's Doubles draw of 13 Grand Slams but only twice made it past the first round. The first time was in the 1998 Wimbledon Championships, when he and partner David DiLucia reached the second round, by defeating Nicolas Lapentti and Javier Sánchez in four sets. In the 1999 Wimbledon Championships he went further, this time partnering countryman Chris Haggard. The pair made the round of 16, after two straight sets victories, but then fell to Ellis Ferreira and Rick Leach.

After he left the tour he became head coach of the tennis program at Birmingham–Southern College.

In 2011, he left Birmingham-Southern to become the Mountain Brook Country Club head tennis director.

ATP career finals

Doubles: 1 (1–0)

Challenger titles

Doubles: (11)

References

External links
 
 

1972 births
Living people
South African male tennis players
South African expatriates in the United States
Tennis players from Johannesburg
South African tennis coaches
UAB Blazers athletes
College men's tennis players in the United States